Yang Yan is a Chinese paralympic powerlifter. She participated at the 2004 Summer Paralympics in the powerlifting competition, being awarded the bronze medal in the women's 52 kg event. Yan also participated at the 2012 Summer Paralympics in the powerlifting competition, being awarded the silver medal in the women's 60 kg event. She participated at the 2016 Summer Paralympics in the powerlifting competition, being awarded the bronze medal in the women's 61 kg event.

References

External links 
Paralympic Games profile

Living people
Place of birth missing (living people)
Year of birth missing (living people)
Chinese female weightlifters
Powerlifters at the 2004 Summer Paralympics
Medalists at the 2004 Summer Paralympics
Powerlifters at the 2012 Summer Paralympics
Medalists at the 2012 Summer Paralympics
Powerlifters at the 2016 Summer Paralympics
Medalists at the 2016 Summer Paralympics
Paralympic medalists in powerlifting
Paralympic bronze medalists for China
Paralympic silver medalists for China
Paralympic powerlifters of China
20th-century Chinese women
21st-century Chinese women